The 2014–15 Lehigh Mountain Hawks women's basketball team represented Lehigh University during the 2014–15 NCAA Division I women's basketball season. The Mountain Hawks, led by twentieth year head coach Sue Troyan, played their home games at Stabler Arena and were members of the Patriot League. They finished the season 19–12, 9–9 in Patriot League play to finish in sixth place. They advanced to the championship game of the Patriot League women's tournament where they lost to American. Despite having 19 wins, they were not invited to a postseason tournament.

Roster

Schedule

|-
!colspan=9 style="background:#502D0E; color:#FFFFFF;"| Non-Conference Regular season

|-
!colspan=9 style="background:#502D0E; color:#FFFFFF;"| Patriot League Regular season

|-
!colspan=9 style="background:#502D0E; color:#FFFFFF;"| Patriot League Women's Tournament

See also
2014–15 Lehigh Mountain Hawks men's basketball team

References

Lehigh
Lehigh Mountain Hawks women's basketball seasons